The little dragonfish or short dragonfish (Eurypegasus draconis) is a species of marine fish in the family Pegasidae. It is widespread throughout the tropical waters of the Indo-Pacific, including the Red Sea.

The little dragonfish can grow up to  length. It sheds its skin in one piece. Millions of these kind of fish are sold for traditional medicine each year in China and Hong Kong alone.

References

External links

http://fran.cornu.free.fr/affichage/affichage_nom.php?id_espece=729
http://australianmuseum.net.au/Little-Dragonfish-Eurypegasus-draconis/
http://www.marinespecies.org/aphia.php?p=taxdetails&id=218161
 

little dragonfish
little dragonfish
Taxonomy articles created by Polbot
Taxa named by Carl Linnaeus